Dghe Subregion is a subregion in the western Gash-Barka region (Zoba Gash-Barka) of  Eritrea. Its capital lies at Dghe.

References

Subregions of Eritrea

Gash-Barka Region
Subregions of Eritrea